The Melanesian Spearhead Group (MSG) is an intergovernmental organization, composed of the four Melanesian states of Fiji, Papua New Guinea, Solomon Islands and Vanuatu, and the Kanak and Socialist National Liberation Front of New Caledonia. In June 2015, Indonesia was recognized as an associate member.

It was founded as a political gathering in 1986. On 23 March 2007, members signed the Agreement Establishing the Melanesian Spearhead Group, formalizing the group under international law. It is headquartered in Port Vila, Vanuatu. A secretariat building was constructed by the People's Republic of China and handed over to the MSG in November 2007. The first Director General of the MSG Secretariat was Rima Ravusiro of Papua New Guinea. Since April 2016, Amena Yauvoli of Fiji heads the MSG Secretariat.

Purpose
Melanesian Spearhead Group was formed with focus to promote economic growth among Melanesian countries. The purpose of the group are:
 To promote and strengthen inter membership trade, exchange of Melanesian cultures, traditions, values and sovereign equality;
 To foster economic and technical cooperation between the members; and
 To align member country's policies and further member's shared goals of economical growth, sustainable development, good governance and security.

One of the key features of the MSG is the Melanesian Spearhead Group Trade Agreement, a sub-regional preferential trade agreement established to foster and accelerate economic development through trade relations and provide a political framework for regular consultations and review on the status of the Agreement, with a view to ensuring that trade both in terms of exports and imports is undertaken in a genuine spirit of Melanesian Solidarity and is done on a most favoured nation (MFN) basis. Negotiations are held regularly between the members' leaders to consider the progress and developments of the agreement. After a revision in 2005, it covers 180 articles free of fiscal duty.

History

Formation
The Melanesian Spearhead Group (MSG) was conceived in 1986 between the three Melanesian Pacific Island Countries namely Papua New Guinea, Vanuatu and Solomon Islands. The MSG Trade Agreement was signed in 1993 by Papua New Guinea, Solomon Islands and Vanuatu. At the 6th Melanesian Spearhead Group (MSG) Trade and Economic Officials’ Meeting on 16 April 1997 in Honiara, the Fiji delegation indicated its willingness to accede to it. This initiative was endorsed at the 1997 MSG Leaders Summit. Fiji became a formal member of the MSG Trade Agreement on 14 April 1998. The 9th MSG Trade & Economic Officials meeting was held in Papua New Guinea on 29 and 30 November 2000. This meeting saw the acceptance of the expansion of the MSG Product Schedule tariff headings from four digit to six digits, thereby facilitating MSG trade by removing the ambiguity in product identification at Customs points of entry. The agreement is General Agreement on Tariffs and Trade (GATT) consistent and has been approved and accorded recognition by the World Trade Organization (WTO) Committee on Regional Arrangements to be compatible and meeting the requirements of Article 24 of the GATT/WTO Agreement.

The Melanesian Spearhead Group Secretariat was established in May 2008 after years of operating on an ad-hoc basic. The opening of a permanent office in Port Vila, Vanuatu, signaled a new phase for the MSG group as it ventured into organizing and managing its affairs in a more structured manner.

Politics
More recently, the Melanesian Spearhead Group got heavily involved in the political discussions following Fiji's suspension from the Pacific Islands Forum in May 2009.

In July 2010, Fiji expelled Australia's acting high commissioner accusing the latter of causing the postponement of a so-called Engaging Fiji meeting. Australia responded that it had to do with the lack of democracy in the country. An alternate meeting was held instead despite pressure from Australia and New Zealand. It was attended by Prime Minister Michael Somare of Papua New Guinea, Prime Minister Derek Sikua of the Solomon Islands, President Anote Tong of Kiribati, Prime Minister Apisai Ielemia of Tuvalu, and Prime Minister Frank Bainimarama of Fiji.

Melanesian Spearhead Group is also involved in the issue of Papua, which involves Indonesian government and a West Papuan separatist movement. Melanesian Spearhead Group's role in raising the international profile of New Caledonia's Kanak independence movement, has prompted West Papuan Independence activists to recognise the significance of its membership. The West Papua National Council for Liberation (WPNCL) hopes to use Melanesian Spearhead Group as an international platform to fight for independence.

Indonesia however, also applied for MSG membership in 2010, arguing that Indonesia is home to 11 million Melanesians mainly residing in 5 provinces in Eastern Indonesia; Papua, West Papua, Maluku, North Maluku and East Nusa Tenggara. Indonesia won observer status in 2011 with the support of Fiji and Papua New Guinea. East Timor was granted observer status in 2011.

In May 2013, Buchtar Tabuni, the leader of the National Committee for West Papua (KNPB) supported the notion that if West Papua was granted independence, he would support them joining the MSG. The WPNCL submitted an unsuccessful application to the MSG in October 2013. The MSG advised that West Papua independence organizations must first unite for any future applications to be considered.

The United Liberation Movement for West Papua (ULMWP) was formed in December 2014. A second application of West Papua independence movement has been submitted in 2015 by the ULMWP, led by spokesperson Benny Wenda.

Expansion
In 24 to 26 June 2015, the summit meeting of the member countries in Honiara, Solomon Islands concluded with key decisions; Indonesia was elevated to associate member of the group — making them the official representative of West Papua region, while the United Liberation Movement for West Papua (ULMWP) remained as an observer. The ULMWP was considered only as the representative of West Papuans outside the country.

Despite being denied of full membership, ULMWP secretary-general Octavianus Mote regarded the observer status positively, saying the diplomatic recognition would help them in their cause. "We might not be a full member of the MSG, but a door has opened to us. We will sit across a table from Indonesia as equal," he said.

However, Indonesia's membership of the MSG has giving them a greater influence in Melanesian politics than the ULMWP. In MSG, Indonesia's official representation will be the governors of Indonesia's five Melanesian provinces. Fijian prime minister Frank Bainimarama, who supported Indonesian membership, argued that his vote was guided by a number of main principles in approaching the West Papuan issue. "Indonesian sovereignty over West Papua cannot be questioned, and the province is an integral part of Indonesia, so when we deal with West Papua and its people, MSG has no choice but to deal with Indonesia, in a positive and constructive manner," he said. Following the decision of elevating Indonesia to associate member, the government of Indonesia, for the first time, hosted the Melanesian Cultural Festival 2015 in Kupang, East Nusa Tenggara from 26 to 30 October 2015, which is aimed at improving cooperation among Melanesian countries. The festival was participated by all members of MSG except Vanuatu, and also Timor Leste.

Membership

Population

Economy

Meetings

See also 
 Polynesian Leaders Group, launched in 2011, partly as a response to the MSG
 Pacific Islands Forum

References

External links
 Agreement Establishing the Melanesian Spearhead Group.
 Melanesian Spearhead Group Trade Agreement.
 MSG: trading on political capital and Melanesian solidarity, Pacific Institute of Public Policy, Briefing Paper 02, July 2008.
 The Renaissance of the Melanesian Spearhead Group, The New Pacific Diplomacy 2015

International organizations based in Oceania
Organizations established in 1983
Politics of Oceania
Melanesia